Capperia maratonica is a moth of the family Pterophoridae. It is found in Spain, France, Italy, Sardinia, Croatia, Serbia and Montenegro, Bulgaria, Romania, Ukraine, North Macedonia, Greece and Cyprus. It has also been recorded from the Palestinian Territories.

The wingspan is about 14 mm. There are two generations per year.

The larvae feed on Teucrium scordium.

References

Oxyptilini
Moths described in 1951
Plume moths of Asia
Plume moths of Europe
Taxa named by Stanislaw Adamczewski